InterGlobe Aviation Limited, doing business as IndiGo, is an Indian low-cost airline headquartered in Gurgaon, Haryana, India. It is the largest airline in India by passengers carried and fleet size, with a ~57% domestic market share as of October 2022. It is also the largest individual Asian low-cost carrier in terms of jet fleet size and passengers carried, and the fourth largest carrier in Asia. The airline has carried over 300+ million passengers as of November 2022.

The airline operates 1,600 daily flights, as of November 2022 to 101 destinations – 75 domestic and 26 international. It has its primary hub at Indira Gandhi International Airport, Delhi.

The airline was founded as a private company by Rahul Bhatia of InterGlobe Enterprises and Rakesh Gangwal in 2006. It took delivery of its first aircraft in July 2006 and commenced operations a month later. The airline became the largest Indian carrier by passenger market share in 2012. The company went public in November 2015. Pieter Elbers is currently the CEO of IndiGo.

IndiGo has been ranked as the 4th most punctual airline globally in 2018, 6th most punctual airline globally in 2019 and 3rd most punctual airline globally in 2021 by OAG Punctuality League.

History 
IndiGo was founded in 2006 as a private company by Rahul Bhatia of InterGlobe Enterprises and Rakesh Gangwal. InterGlobe had a 51.12% stake in IndiGo and 47.88% was held by Gangwal's Virginia-based company Caelum Investments. IndiGo placed a firm order for 100 Airbus A320-200 aircraft in June 2005 with plans to begin operations in mid-2006. IndiGo took delivery of its first aircraft on 28 July 2006, nearly a year after placing the order. It commenced operations on 4 August 2006 with a service from New Delhi to Imphal via Guwahati. By the end of 2006, the airline had six aircraft, and nine more were acquired in 2007. In December 2010, IndiGo replaced state-run carrier Air India as the third largest airline in India, behind Kingfisher Airlines and Jet Airways with a passenger market share of 17.3%.

In 2011, IndiGo placed an order for 180 Airbus A320 aircraft in a deal worth US$15 billion. In January 2011, after completing five years of operations, the airline got permission to launch international flights. In December 2011, the DGCA expressed reservations that the rapid expansion could impact passenger safety.

In February 2012, IndiGo took delivery of its 50th aircraft, less than six years after it began operations. For the quarter ending March 2012, IndiGo was the most profitable airline in India and became the second largest airline in India in terms of passenger market share. On 17 August 2012, IndiGo became the largest airline in India in terms of market share surpassing Jet Airways, six years after commencing operations.

In January 2013, IndiGo was the second-fastest-growing low-cost carrier in Asia behind Indonesian airline Lion Air. In February 2013, following the announcement of the Civil Aviation Ministry that it would allow IndiGo to take delivery of only five aircraft that year, the airline planned to introduce low-cost regional flights by setting up a subsidiary. Later, IndiGo announced that it planned to seek permission from the ministry to acquire four more aircraft, therefore taking delivery of nine aircraft in 2013. As of March 2014, IndiGo is the second-largest low-cost carrier in Asia in terms of seats flown.

In August 2015, IndiGo placed an order for 250 Airbus A320neo aircraft worth $27 billion, making it the largest single order ever in Airbus history. IndiGo announced a  initial public offering on 19 October 2015 which opened on 27 October 2015.

In October 2019, IndiGo placed another order for 300 Airbus A320neo aircraft worth ₹2.3 lakh crore (US$33 billion), surpassing its own record of the largest single order ever in Airbus history.

In December 2019, the airline became the first Indian airline to operate 1,500 daily flights. On 31 December 2019, it became India's first airline to have a fleet size of more than 250 aircraft.

Corporate affairs

Ownership and structure 
Interglobe Aviation Limited is publicly traded under NSE: INDIGO, with a market capitalisation of about ₹32,702.61 crore as of 23 March 2020.

Headquarters 
IndiGo is headquartered in Gurugram, Haryana, India.

Destinations 

, IndiGo operates more than 1,600 daily flights to 101 destinations, 75 in India and 26 abroad. Its main base is located at Delhi, with additional bases at Bengaluru, Chennai, Hyderabad, Kolkata, Mumbai, and Kochi, In January 2011, IndiGo received a license to operate international flights after completing five years of operations. IndiGo's first international service was launched between New Delhi and Dubai on 1 September 2011.

Codeshare agreements
IndiGo codeshares with the following airlines:

 Air France
 American Airlines
 KLM
 Qantas
 Qatar Airways
 Turkish Airlines
 Virgin Atlantic

Fleet 

, IndiGo operates the following aircraft:

Fleet developments 
IndiGo placed an order for 100 Airbus A320-200 aircraft worth US$6 billion in June 2005 during the Paris Air Show with plans to commence operations in mid-2006. The airline received its first A320 in July 2006 and planned to induct 100 aircraft by 2015–2016. IndiGo signed a memorandum of understanding for an additional 180 Airbus A320 aircraft including 150 with the New Engine Option (NEO) worth US$15 billion on 11 January 2011. In 2012, the airline took delivery of its 50th aircraft and the 100th aircraft was delivered on 4 November 2014, completing its initial order ahead of schedule.

The Airbus A320neo family aircraft ordered in 2011 were to be delivered starting 2015. However, due to a delay in the production and delivery of these aircraft, IndiGo dry-leased a total of 22 used aircraft to cope with the demand. On 15 October 2014, IndiGo expressed its intention to order a further 250 A320neo aircraft worth US$25.7 billion at list prices. On 15 August 2015, IndiGo confirmed the order for 250 A320neo aircraft for $26.5 billion. The order also provides IndiGo the flexibility to convert some A320neos to A321neoLRs that can seat more passengers and fly on longer routes. The order for 250 jets was Airbus' single largest order by number of aircraft. IndiGo received the first A320neo in March 2016. On 10 October 2019, Airbus delivered its 1000th A320neo aircraft to Indigo. On 29 October 2019, IndiGo placed a firm order for 300 A320neo Family aircraft comprising a mix of 87 A320neo and 213 A321neo/A321XLR, taking IndiGo's total number of A320neo Family aircraft orders to 730.

IndiGo took delivery of its first ATR 72–600 in November 2017.

Services 

Being a low-cost carrier, IndiGo offers only economy class seating. To keep fares low, IndiGo does not provide complimentary meals on any of its flights, though it does have a buy-on-board in-flight meal programme. No in-flight entertainment is available. Hello 6E, the in-flight magazine published by IndiGo, is available for passengers to read. IndiGo offers premium services, such as a pre-assigned seat, multiple cancellations and priority check-in, to passengers who are willing to pay a higher fare. In September 2019, the company announced its tie up with SonyLIV, an on demand video app for providing its passengers with entertainment options in-flight and at the airport.

See also 
 List of airports in India
 Aviation in India
 List of companies of India
 Transport in India

References

Notes

External links 

 

Airlines of India
Airlines established in 2006
Companies based in Gurgaon
Low-cost carriers
Indian brands
Indian companies established in 2006
2006 establishments in Haryana
Companies listed on the National Stock Exchange of India
Companies listed on the Bombay Stock Exchange